Mystras or Mistras, also known in the Chronicle of the Morea as Myzithras (Μυζηθρᾶς), is a fortified town and a former municipality in Laconia, Peloponnese, Greece. Situated on Mt. Taygetus, near ancient Sparta, it served as the capital of the Byzantine Despotate of the Morea in the 14th and 15th centuries, experiencing a period of prosperity and cultural flowering during the Palaeologan Renaissance, including the teachings of Gemistos Plethon. The city also attracted artists and architects of the highest quality. The site remained inhabited throughout the Ottoman period, when Western travellers mistook it for ancient Sparta. In the 1830s, it was abandoned and the new town of Sparti was built, approximately eight kilometres to the east. Since the 2011 local government reform it is part of the Sparti municipality. As an exceptionally well-preserved example of a Byzantine city and because of its testimony to the development of Late Byzantine and Post-byzantine art, Mystras was inscribed on the UNESCO World Heritage List in 1989.

Description
Mystras is situated on the slopes of Taygetos Mountain. The archaeological site stands above the modern village of Mystras and the city of Sparti. The greenery surrounding the area is composed mainly by pine trees and cypresses. Some small rivers and lakes are found in the region. The city's architecture was influenced by the "Helladic" school of Byzantine architecture, and its urban layout was informed by the architecture of Constantinople. During the  Palaeologan Renaissance, the churches of Mystras were covered in elaborate frescoes and were well known for their libraries. Some of these decorations can still be seen in the Hagia Sophia church in the archeological site.

History

Foundation and Frankish rule

In late 1248, William II of Villehardouin, ruler of the Frankish Principality of Achaea, captured Monemvasia, the last remaining Byzantine outpost on the Morea. This success was soon followed by the submission of the restive Tsakones on Mount Parnon, the Slavic Melingoi tribe of Mount Taygetos, and the inhabitants of the Mani peninsula, thereby extending his sway over all of Laconia and completing the conquest of the peninsula, which had begun in 1205, in the aftermath of the Fourth Crusade. Laconia was incorporated into the princely domain, and the young prince passed the winter of 1248–49 there, touring the country and selecting sites for new fortifications such as Grand Magne and Leuktron; finally, near his residence of Lacedaemon (ancient Sparta), on a spur of Mount Taygetos, he built the fortress that came to be known as Mystras.

Byzantine restoration
In September 1259, William of Villehardouin was defeated and captured, along with many of his nobles, at the Battle of Pelagonia, by the forces of the Nicaean emperor Michael VIII Palaiologos. Two years later, the Nicaeans recaptured Constantinople, putting an end to the Latin Empire and restoring the Byzantine Empire. At this point, the emperor concluded an agreement with the captive prince: William and his men would be set free in exchange for an oath of fealty, and for the cession of Monemvasia, Grand Magne, and Mystras. The handover was effected in 1262, and henceforth Mystras was the seat of the governor of the Byzantine territories in the Morea. Initially this governor (kephale) was changed every year, but after 1308 they started being appointed for longer terms. Almost immediately on his return to the Morea, William of Villehardouin renounced his oath to the emperor, and warfare broke out between Byzantines and Franks. The first Byzantine attempts to subdue the Principality of Achaea were beaten back in the battles of Prinitsa and Makryplagi, but the Byzantines were firmly ensconced in Laconia. Warfare became endemic, and the Byzantines slowly pushed the Franks back. The insecurity engendered by the raids and counter-raids caused the inhabitants of Lacedaemon to abandon their exposed city and settle at Mystras, in a new town built under the shadow of the fortress.

While Mystras served as the provincial capital from this time, it became a royal capital in 1349 CE, when the first despot was appointed to rule over the Morea. The Byzantine Emperor John VI Kantakouzenos, reorganized the territory in 1349 to establish it as an appanage for his son, the Despot Manuel Kantakouzenos. From 1349 until its surrender to the Ottoman Turks on 31 May 1460, Mystras was the residence of a Despot who ruled over the Byzantine Morea, known as the "Despotate of the Morea". For the larger portion of his reign, Manuel maintained peaceful relations with his Latin neighbors and secured a long period of prosperity for the area. Greco-Latin cooperation included an alliance to contain the raids of the Ottoman Sultan Murad I into Morea in the 1360s. The rival Palaiologos dynasty seized the Morea after Manuel's death in 1380, with Theodore I Palaiologos becoming despot in 1383. Theodore ruled until 1407, consolidating Byzantine rule and coming to terms with his more powerful neighbours—particularly the expansionist Ottoman Empire, whose suzerainty he recognised. 

This was the city's golden age; according to the Oxford Dictionary of Byzantium, Mystras "witnessed a remarkable cultural renaissance, including the teaching of Plethon, and attracted artists and architects of the highest quality"

Centre of learning and culture
Mystras was the last centre of Byzantine learning and culture; the famous Neoplatonist philosopher Gemistos Plethon lived there until he died in 1452. While there, Plethon served as a tutor and advisor to the young despot Theodore II until his death in 1452. He and other scholars based in Mystras influenced the Italian Renaissance, especially after he accompanied the emperor John VIII Palaiologos to Florence in 1439.

Ottoman and Venetian years
The last Byzantine emperor, Constantine XI Palaiologos, was despot at Mystras before he came to the throne. Demetrios Palaiologos, the last despot of Morea, surrendered the city to Sultan Mehmed II in 30 May 1460. Under Ottoman rule it became part of the Sanjak of Mezistre. The Venetians occupied it from 1687 to 1715, but otherwise the Ottomans held it until 1821. The city joined the Orlov revolt in 1770. It was looted by Ottoman Albanians and the metropolitan bishop Ananias executed, despite having saved several Albanian lives in the uprising. A great number of local Greeks were also killed by the Albanian groups, while several children were sold into slavery. Mystras was left in ruins and this event was a significant factor leading up to its abandonment.

Modern years
The final straw to Mystras came in 1823 during the Greek war of Independence when Egyptians under the rule of Ibrahim massacred the local population and destroyed the local area. The town was rebuilt 9 km away under the name Sparti in 1831. Most families moved to Sparti, but a few decided to move instead to New Mystras, a small village in the countryside. This process of relocation was completed in 1953 when the remaining properties were confiscated by the municipality. In 1989 the ruins, including the fortress, palace, churches, and monasteries, were named a UNESCO World Heritage Site and features a museum and the partially restored ruins of the city. The only inhabitants today are a group of nuns who reside in the Pantanassa Monastery. The majority of the most important churches are still standing, including St. Demetrios, the Hagia Sophia, St. George, and the Monastery of Peribleptos. The Palace of the Despots has undergone substantial restorations in the past decade, making it a significant attraction. Visitors can reach the ruins via the modern city of Sparti, which is only a few miles from Mystras.

Subdivisions
The municipal unit Mystras is subdivided into the following communities:
Agia Eirini
Agios Ioannis Lakedaimonas
Anavryti
Barsinikos
Longastra
Magoula, the municipality seat of Mystras.
Mystras
Paroreio
Soustianoi
Trypi

Historical population

Notable people

People from Mystras
Manuel Kantakouzenos, first Despot of Morea

People buried in Mystras
John VI Kantakouzenos
Manuel Kantakouzenos
Gemistos Plethon
Theodora Tocco
Cleofe Malatesta

Plan

 1. Main entrance;
 2. Metropolis;
 3. Evangelistria Church;
 4. Church of Saints Theodores;
 5. Hodigitria-Afendiko;
 6. Monemvasia Gate;
 7. Church of Saint Nicholas;
 8. Despot's Palace and square;
 9. Nauplia Gate;
 10. Upper entrance to the citadel;
 11. Church of Hagia Sophia;
 12. Small Palace;
 13. Citadel;
 14. Mavroporta;
 15. Pantanassa;
 16. Church of the Taxiarchs;
 17. House of John Phrangopoulos;
 18. Peribleptos Monastery;
 19. Church of Saint George;
 20. Krevatas House;
 21. Marmara (entrance);
 22. Aï-Yannakis;
 23. Laskaris' House;
 24. Church of Saint Christopher;
 25. Ruins;
 26. Church of Saint Kyriaki.

Gallery

See also
List of settlements in Laconia
Despotate of Mystras

References

Sources

)

External links

GTP - Mystras

 
Populated places in Laconia
Populated places of the Byzantine Empire
Despotate of the Morea
World Heritage Sites in Greece